Astrid Sandvik (born 1 October 1939) is a Norwegian Alpine skier who finished tied for sixth place (with fellow Norwegian and 1958 Holmenkollen medalist Inger Bjørnbakken) in the women's slalom at the 1956 Winter Olympics in Cortina d'Ampezzo.  In 1963, Sandvik was awarded the Holmenkollen medal (shared with Alevtina Kolchina, Pavel Kolchin, and Torbjørn Yggeseth.).  Sandvik is one of only eleven non-Nordic skiers to win the Holmenkollen medal (Stein Eriksen, King Haakon VII, Boghild Niskin, Inger Bjørnbakken, Sandvik, King Olav V, Erik Håker, Jacob Vaage, King Harald V, and Queen Sonja (all from Norway); and Ingemar Stenmark (Sweden) are the others.).

She also finished fourth in the slalom twice at the Alpine Skiing World Championships (1958, 1962) and competed at three Winter Olympics.

References

External links
 
  - click Holmenkollmedaljen for downloadable pdf file 

1939 births
Living people
Alpine skiers at the 1956 Winter Olympics
Alpine skiers at the 1960 Winter Olympics
Alpine skiers at the 1964 Winter Olympics
Holmenkollen medalists
Norwegian female alpine skiers
Olympic alpine skiers of Norway
Universiade medalists in alpine skiing
Universiade silver medalists for Norway
Competitors at the 1962 Winter Universiade